Premsai is an Indian film director and former actor. As an actor, he was acclaimed for playing many different prominent roles in Tamil and Telugu television serials and tele films. Later he ventured in to Direction. His debut film was Tamilselvanum Thaniyar Anjalum starring Jai, Santhanam, Yami Gautam in Tamil and Courier Boy Kalyan in Telugu with Nitin & Yami Gautam.  It was produced by Gautham Vasudev Menon.

Early life 
Premsai was born on 29 September in Chennai. He started his media career in the year 1998 first he ventured into acting in Serials and tele films in Tamil and Telugu.  He was introduced by AVM Productions in a teleserial by legendary director S. P. Muthuraman he featured in a single episode in that serial. He was choosy in selecting scripts which helped him work with the best of technicians such as Balu Mahendra, K. Balachander, A.C.Trilokchander, S.P.Muthuraman, Revathy, Venkat and Ramesh Raja.

Direction 
Premsai moved from acting and ventured into direction to explore his creative abilities into writing and direction. He directed his first telefilm Manasa Vaacha Karma with Venu Arvind in the lead which got him a very good recognition and Director Prabhu Deva noticed and he went on to assist him in films as associate director in the film Shankar Dada Zindabad with mega star Chiranjeevi in the lead.

He later worked as a co-director & dialogue writer for Prabhu deva in Engeyum Kadhal starring Jayam Ravi and Hansika Motwani in the lead. 
As a director he debuted with a bilingual film titled Tamilselvanum Thaniyar Anjalum starring Jai, Santhanam, Yami Gautam in the lead in Tamil and   Courier Boy Kalyan in Telugu with Nithin & Yami Gautam in the lead . It was produced by Gautham Vasudev Menon.

Filmography

Director

Co- Director , Associate Director

Actor

TeleSerial — Tamil

TeleSerial — Telugu

Films
Rajadhi Raja (2009) and many more

Awards

References 

Living people
Telugu film directors
Tamil film directors
Male actors in Tamil cinema
Film directors from Chennai
Male actors from Chennai
Year of birth missing (living people)